Coleophora multicristatella is a moth of the family Coleophoridae. It is found in Canada, including Nova Scotia.

The larvae feed on the leaves of Gaylussacia baccata and Rhododendron canadense. They create a composite leaf case.

References

multicristatella
Moths described in 1954
Moths of North America